Viktor Kráľ (born 10 July 1994) is a Slovak football forward who currently plays for ŠKF Sereď.

FC Nitra
He made his professional debut for FC Nitra against MFK Ružomberok on 2 April 2013, entering in as a substitute in place of  Cléber.

External links
FC Nitra profile
Corgoň Liga profile

References

1994 births
Living people
Slovak footballers
Association football forwards
FC Nitra players
FK Slovan Duslo Šaľa players
Slovak Super Liga players